Laurens Prins, anglicized as Lawrence Prince, (c. 1630s, Amsterdam – after 1717) was a 17th-century Dutch buccaneer, privateer and an officer under Captain Sir Henry Morgan. He and Major John Morris led one of the columns against Panama in 1671.

Biography
According to Spanish accounts, Lawrence Prince was a Dutchman from Amsterdam who arrived in the Caribbean in the late 1650s. In 1659, he was one of four men, including John Morris and Robert Searle, who bought a captured Spanish prize from Commodore Christopher Myngs following his ten-week voyage. Prince was forced to retreat, however, when they were surprised by cannon fire from a recently built island fort protecting the settlement. Prince and his men, determined to "make voyage", sailed north to Nicaragua in August. As in Colombia, Prince sailed up the San Juan River, captured a Spanish fort and paddled by canoe to Lake Nicaragua where they successfully raided Granada. This was almost identical to Morgan's raid in 1664. Official Spanish reports of the incident claimed that Prince "made havoc and a thousand destructions, sending the head of a priest in a basket and demanding 70,000 pesos in ransom."

Arriving in Port Royal weeks later, he and two other captains were reproved by Governor Thomas Modyford for attacking the Spanish without a commission or letter of marque. Modyford thought it prudent not "to press the matter too far in this juncture" and ordered them to join Morgan on his raid against Panama, "which they were very ready to do". Impressed by his raid at Granada, Morgan appointed Prince third in command under himself and Captain Edward Collier. He and Major John Morris later led the vanguard, numbering 300 buccaneers, against the Spanish fortress on the morning of January 28, 1671. Prince supported the main force, around 600 men, with Morgan and Collier leading the right and left wings, while the rearguard was commanded by Colonel Bledry Morgan.

In the final advance, he and Morris commanded the left flank. Advancing in a wide sweep around the Spanish right flank, they captured a hill overlooking the Spanish lines. This not only forced the Spanish defenders into committing to an attack, it also disrupted plans by their commander, Juan Perez de Guzman, to stampede a herd of cattle and other livestock towards the advancing buccaneers. He had kept them behind his infantry line, intending to allow the buccaneers to pass through his lines, and setting them against the attackers to presumably disrupt and disorganize them just before the Spanish foot made contact with the buccaneering force. Instead, the Spanish cattle drovers were scared away by Prince's attack, allowing the cattle to wander among the Spanish lines. A simultaneous assault on the hill and against Morgan's advancing buccaneers ended in disaster as concentrated volley fire decimated Spanish forces, which suffered 100 casualties in the first volley alone. The wandering cattle and concentrated fire, left between 400 and 500 dead and wounded before the Spanish finally retreated from the field.

He was later appointed a lieutenant by Modyford's successor, Sir Thomas Lynch, who replaced Captain John Wilgress, commander of HMS Assistance, with Major William Beeston. Lynch may have intended to initiate the restructuring of colonial administration, surrounding himself with known associates rather than appointed officials of the British crown. By 1672, using his share from the Panama raid, Prince became a wealthy landowner on the Liguanea plain as it was opened up for cultivation and farming.

Prince is commonly mistaken for the English slave trader Lawrence Prince, who captained ships for independent slave traders during the decline of the Royal African Company. That Lawrence Prince gained notoriety as the ill-fated captain of the Whydah, which was captured by the pirate "Black Sam" Bellamy.

In popular culture 
In the video game Assassin's Creed IV: Black Flag, Laurens Prins is a Dutch slave trader. In Kingston, he discovered Bartholomew Roberts is a "Sage", so Edward Kenway, helped by Blackbeard, attacked a fort and  looked for Roberts. He attempts to sell Bartholomew Roberts to the Templars, but is killed by Edward Kenway in the garden house in front of the residence before he can do so. Laurens Prins is compared with Edward Kenway, because both want money and neither believe in a greater cause than freedom, but Prins uses his belief to justify his status as a slave trader.

References

Further reading
Roberts, Walter Adolphe. Sir Henry Morgan, Buccaneer and Governor. New York: Covici-Friede, 1933.
Winston, Alexander. No Man Knows My Grave: Sir Henry Morgan, Captain William Kidd, Captain Woodes Rogers in the Golden Age of Privateers and Pirates, 1665-1715. New York: Houghton Mifflin, 1969.
Clifford, Barry and Turchi, Peter. The Pirate Prince: Discovering the Priceless Treasures of the Sunken Ship WHYDAH. New York/London: Simon & Schuster, 1993.
National Geographic Society and Arts & Exhibitions International and Clifford, Barry and Kinkor, Kenneth and Simpson, Sharon. "Real Pirates: The Untold Story of The WHYDAH from Slave Ship to Pirate Ship". Washington D.C.: National Geographic Society, 2007.
Perry, Paul and Clifford, Barry. "Expedition WHYDAH: The Story of the World's First Excavation of a Pirate Treasure Ship and the Man Who Found Her". New York: Harper Collins, 1999. Kent, UK: Headline Book Publishing, 1999.

1630s births 
1717 deaths
17th-century Dutch businesspeople
18th-century Dutch businesspeople
17th-century Jamaican people
18th-century Jamaican people
17th-century pirates
Dutch pirates
Dutch privateers
Dutch slave traders
Military personnel from Amsterdam